Budzynski or Budzyński (feminine: Budzyńska; plural: Budzyńscy) is a Polish surname. It may refer to:

 Dominik Budzyński (born 1992), Polish footballer
 Eugeniusz Budzyński (1893–1940), Polish physician
 Michał Budzyński (born 1988), Polish footballer
 Robert Budzynski (born 1994), French footballer
 Roman Budzyński (1933–1994), Polish sprinter
 Stanisław Budzyński, Polish amanuensis
 Thomas Budzynski (1933–2011), American psychologist
 Tomasz Budzyński (born 1962), Polish musician
 Wiktor Budzyński (1888–1976), Polish politician
 Wincenty Budzyński (1815–1866), Polish activist and chess master

See also
 
 Budzinski

Polish-language surnames